Hyperbaric nursing is a nursing specialty involved in the care of patients receiving hyperbaric oxygen therapy.  The National Board of Diving and Hyperbaric Medical Technology offers certification in hyperbaric nursing as a Certified Hyperbaric Registered Nurse (CHRN).  The professional nursing organization for hyperbaric nursing is the Baromedical Nurses Association.

Hyperbaric nurses are responsible for administering hyperbaric oxygen therapy to patients and supervising them throughout the treatment. These nurses must work under a supervising physician trained in hyperbarics who is available during the treatment in case of emergency. Hyperbaric nurses either join the patient inside the multiplace hyperbaric oxygen chamber or operate the machine from outside of the monoplace hyperbaric oxygen chamber, monitoring for adverse reactions to the treatment. Patients can experience adverse reactions to the hyperbaric oxygen therapy such as oxygen toxicity, hypoglycemia, anxiety, otic barotrauma, or pneumothorax. The nurse must know how to handle each adverse event appropriately. The most common adverse effect is otic barotrauma, trauma to the inner ear due to pressure not being released on descent. Since hyperbaric oxygen therapy is usually administered daily for a set number of treatments, adverse effects must be prevented in order for the patient to receive all prescribed treatments. The hyperbaric nurse will collaborate with the patient's physician to determine if hyperbaric oxygen therapy is the right treatment. The nurse must know all approved indications that warrant hyperbaric oxygen therapy treatments, along with contraindications to the treatment.

References

Nursing specialties